William H. Joslin was a member of the Wisconsin State Assembly.

Biography
Joslin was born on September 25, 1829 in Ypsilanti, Michigan. On October 24, 1852, he married Margaret M. Gillam. They would have seven children. Joslin died on September 2, 1926 in Richland Center, Wisconsin.

The Joslin Monument in Richland Center is dedicated to his brother, James Wallace Joslin.

Political career
Joslin was a member of the Assembly during the 1880 session. Other positions he held include Sheriff of Richland County, Wisconsin in 1859 and 1860, along with County Treasurer in 1869, 1870, 1871 and 1872. He was a Republican.

Military career
During the American Civil War, Joslin served with the 25th Wisconsin Volunteer Infantry Regiment of the Union Army. Battles he participated in include the Battle of Resaca, the Battle of Dallas, the Battle of Kennesaw Mountain, the Battle of Atlanta, the Battle of Decatur, the Battle of Rivers' Bridge and the Battle of Bentonville. Additionally, Joslin took part in the Meridian Expedition and Sherman's March to the Sea. He was brevetted a colonel.

References

Politicians from Ypsilanti, Michigan
People from Richland Center, Wisconsin
Republican Party members of the Wisconsin State Assembly
Wisconsin sheriffs
County treasurers in Wisconsin
People of Wisconsin in the American Civil War
Union Army colonels
1829 births
1926 deaths
Burials in Wisconsin
Military personnel from Michigan